South Holland is a village and south suburb of Chicago in Cook County, Illinois, United States, within Thornton Township. The population was 21,465 at the 2020 census.

History
 
The area currently occupied by South Holland, Illinois, was first settled in 1846 by immigrants from South Holland, Netherlands. When the community formally incorporated as a village in 1894, its population was about 1,000. Originally a general farming community, it later specialized in vegetable growing, especially onion sets. By the 1940s South Holland was known as the "Onion Set Capital of the World". The town was built on low ground near the Calumet River and was originally called de Laage Prairie (Low Prairie) to differentiate it from another Dutch settlement further north on higher ground and called de Hooge Prairie (now the Roseland neighborhood of Chicago).

In October 2007, Forbes.com declared South Holland to be the "Most Livable Metro-Area suburb" of the Chicago metropolitan area.

Geography
South Holland is located at  (41.60, -87.60). It is bordered by Harvey and Phoenix to the west, Dolton to the north, Thornton to the south, and Calumet City and Lansing to the east.

South Holland's addresses and numbered streets are 3 blocks ahead of Chicago's grid. For example, 159th Street is actually called 162nd Street.

Surrounding areas
 Dolton 
 Harvey    Calumet City 
 Phoenix / Harvey   Calumet City
 East Hazel Crest    Lansing
 Thornton

Demographics

As of the 2020 census there were 21,465 people, 7,418 households, and 5,505 families residing in the village. The racial makeup of the village was 80.96% African American, 10.42% White, 0.28% Native American, 0.42% Asian, 0.02% Pacific Islander, 3.90% from other races, and 3.99% from two or more races. Hispanic or Latino of any race were 6.60% of the population.

There were 7,418 households, out of which 48.14% had children under the age of 18 living with them, 42.57% were married couples living together, 26.03% had a female householder with no husband present, and 25.79% were non-families. 24.16% of all households were made up of individuals, and 12.25% had someone living alone who was 65 years of age or older. The average household size was 3.36 and the average family size was 2.82.

The village's age distribution consisted of 23.0% under the age of 18, 8.0% from 18 to 24, 21.8% from 25 to 44, 30.6% from 45 to 64, and 16.7% who were 65 years of age or older. The median age was 42.7 years. For every 100 females, there were 81.6 males. For every 100 females age 18 and over, there were 80.6 males.

The median income for a household in the village was $66,859, and the median income for a family was $79,688. Males had a median income of $41,500 versus $35,913 for females. The per capita income for the village was $28,649. About 9.3% of families and 11.2% of the population were below the poverty line, including 19.2% of those under age 18 and 11.0% of those age 65 or over.

Note: the US Census treats Hispanic/Latino as an ethnic category. This table excludes Latinos from the racial categories and assigns them to a separate category. Hispanics/Latinos can be of any race.

Government
South Holland is in Illinois's 2nd congressional district.

Notable people 

 Eddy Curry, forward for the Chicago Bulls, New York Knicks, and Miami Heat
 Kevin DeYoung, pastor, author
 Kevin Drumm, musician
 Cliff Floyd, All-Star outfielder for seven Major League Baseball teams
 Norman J. Kansfield, minister noted for being suspended after officiating at his daughter's same-sex marriage
 James Meeks, state senator, representing Illinois' 15th district
 Mark Mulder, pitcher for the Oakland Athletics and St. Louis Cardinals
 Frederick Nymeyer, industrialist, author, and publisher
 Robert Shaw, former Chicago alderman and former commissioner of the Cook County Board of Review
 Steve Trout, pitcher for the Chicago White Sox, Chicago Cubs, New York Yankees, and Seattle Mariners
 Jason Weaver, actor and singer

Education
South Holland is served by several school districts:
 South Holland School District 150
 Greenwood School (K-3)
 McKinley  School (4-8)
 South Holland School District 151
 Taft School (PreK-1)
 Eisenhower School (2-3)
 Madison School (4-5)
 Coolidge Junior High School (6-8)

Thornton Township High School District 205 serves all of South Holland.

Thornwood High School is located in South Holland. Thornridge High School and Thornton Township High School are also within District 205.

The private K-8 schools, Calvin Christian School and Calvary Academy, are located in South Holland. Seton Academy was a Catholic co-educational high school located in the village. It was formerly an all-girls school until 2003 when boys were admitted. Seton Academy closed on June 30, 2016. Christ our Savior School and Holy Ghost School also were once both in South Holland, but both have been closed by the Chicago Archdiocese.

South Holland is home to the main campus of South Suburban College.

In literature
The 1925 Pulitzer Prize-winning novel So Big by Edna Ferber is set in South Holland. The Widow Paarlberg inspired one of the main characters and her family farm is preserved in a municipal park.

The 2021 novel "Termination Shock" by Neal Stephenson includes a lead character, child of a conservative Dutch father and Indonesian mother, who spends his childhood in South Holland during the 1950s and 1960s. Though the town isn't named its description in the novel fits only South Holland, Illinois during that time period.

References

External links
 

 
Chicago metropolitan area
Villages in Cook County, Illinois
Villages in Illinois
Populated places established in 1846
Dutch-American culture in Illinois
1846 establishments in Illinois
Majority-minority cities and towns in Cook County, Illinois